The Complaint of the Poor Commons of Kent was a manifesto issued by Jack Cade, a Kentish rebel in 1450, before his march on London. The 'popular grievances' from this manifesto were frequently quoted by the Yorkists during The Wars of the Roses, for propaganda purposes.

External links
 Full text, modernized by Prof. Jerome Arkenberg.

 Full text, in the original in "Three fifteenth-century chronicles..." by John Stowe

15th century in England
Medieval Kent
1450 in Europe